In enzymology, a tryptophan dimethylallyltransferase is an enzyme that catalyzes the chemical reaction

dimethylallyl diphosphate + L-tryptophan  diphosphate + 4-(3-methylbut-2-enyl)-L-tryptophan

Thus, the two substrates of this enzyme are dimethylallyl diphosphate and L-tryptophan, whereas its two products are diphosphate and 4-(3-methylbut-2-enyl)-L-tryptophan.

This enzyme belongs to the family of transferases, specifically those transferring aryl or alkyl groups other than methyl groups.

References

 

EC 2.5.1
Enzymes of unknown structure